The 2003 Regal Welsh Open was a professional ranking snooker tournament that took place from 22 to 26 January at the Cardiff International Arena in Cardiff, Wales.

Paul Hunter was the defending champion, but he lost in the semi-finals 2–6 against Mark Williams. Williams in turn lost to Stephen Hendry 9–5 in the final. Hendry won his third Welsh Open title and the 34th ranking title of his career.

Tournament summary
Defending champion Paul Hunter was the number 1 seed with World Champion Peter Ebdon seeded 2. The remaining places were allocated to players based on the world rankings.

Prize fund
The breakdown of prize money for this year is shown below:

Winner: £82,500
Runner-up: £42,500
Semi-final: £21,250
Quarter-final: £11,700
Last 16: £9,600
Last 32: £7,800
Last 48: £4,000
Last 64: £3,150

Last 80: £2,150
Last 96: £1,450

Stage one highest break: £1,800
Stage two highest break: £7,500

Stage one maximum break: £5,000
Stage two maximum break: £20,000

Total: £597,200

Main draw

Final

Qualifying

Round 1 
Best of 9 frames

Round 2–5

Century breaks

 140, 127, 124, 113, 108, 104  Stephen Hendry
 139  Robin Hull
 133  Leo Fernandez
 132  Ali Carter
 128  Michael Holt
 127  John Higgins
 120  Anthony Hamilton
 116, 100  Mark Williams
 110  Paul Hunter
 109, 104  Ronnie O'Sullivan
 109  Alan McManus
 101, 101  Marco Fu

References

2003
Welsh Open
Open (snooker)
Welsh Open, 2003